Gil is a masculine given name, often a diminutive form (hypocorism) of Gilbert. Another version of this name is Gill. It may refer to:

People
 Gil Amelio (born 1943), technology executive and former CEO of Apple Inc.
 Gil Baiano (born 1966), Brazilian retired footballer
 Gil Bellows (born 1967), Canadian actor
 Gil Birmingham (born 1953), American actor
 Gil Cohen (disambiguation), several people
 Gil Eanes, Portuguese explorer
 Gil Elvgren (1914-1980), American pin-up artist
 Gil Evans (1912-1988), Canadian jazz pianist, arranger, composer and bandleader
 Gil Fronsdal (born 1954), American Buddhist teacher
 Gil Gerard (born 1943), American actor, star of the TV series Buck Rogers in the 25th Century
 Gil Goldstein (born 1950), American jazz pianist
 Gil Gomes (born 1972), Portuguese retired footballer
 Gil Hayes (1939–2022), Canadian former professional wrestler
 Gil Heron (1922-2008), Jamaican footballer
 Gil Hodges (1924-1972), American Major League Baseball player and manager
 Gil Kim (born 1981), American baseball coach and executive
 Gil Meche (born 1978), American retired Major League Baseball pitcher
 Gil Nickel (1939-2003), American vintner
 Gil Ofarim (born 1982), German singer and songwriter
 Gil Ofer (born 1976), Israeli Olympic judoka
 Gil Perkins (1907-1999), Australian actor
 Gilberto Ribeiro Gonçalves (born 1980), Brazilian footballer
 Gil Robinson (1910-1985), American football player
 Gil Santos (1938–2018), American radio commentator for the New England Patriots football team
 Gil Schwartz, pen name of Stanley Bing (1951–2020), business humorist and novelist
 Gil Shaham (born 1971), Israeli-American violinist
 Gil Shwed (born 1952), Israeli programmer and entrepreneur
 Gil Scott-Heron (1949-2011), American spoken word performer and rap pioneer
 Gil Semedo (born 1974), Cape Verdean singer
 Gil Simkovitch (born 1982), Israeli Olympic sport shooter
 Gil Stein (archaeologist), American archaeologist
 Gil Stein (ice hockey) (1928–2022), American lawyer, law instructor and former National Hockey League president
 Gil Student (born 1972), American blogger
 Gil Vainshtein (born 1984), Canadian soccer player

Fictional characters
 Gil Grissom, on the American TV series CSI: Crime Scene Investigation, played by actor William Petersen
 Gil Gunderson, a recurring character on the animated TV series The Simpsons
 Gil Chesterton, a supporting character on the TV sitcom Frasier
 Gil, in the 1985 arcade game The Tower of Druaga
 Gil, in the manga Dragon Knights
 Gil, on the American/Canadian children's TV series Bubble Guppies
 Gil Hammerstein from the video game Lights, Camera, Pants!
 Gil Shannon, the main character of the Sniper Elite novel series written by Scott McEwen

See also
 Gill (name)

Masculine given names
Hypocorisms